Klareboderne is a street in the Old Town of Copenhagen, Denmark. It runs from Købmagergade in the west to Pilestræde in the east where it turns into Møntergade and continues to Gothersgade. The Gyldendal publishing house is based in the Gyldendal House at No. 3.

History

The street name refers to St. Clare's Monastery which was established at the eastern end of the street in 1493. The name is known from at least 1518 when a document mentions "Albritt van Gocks bod her, som nu kallis Clare bodher" ("Albritt van Gock's houses which are now called Clar'e houses". Later in the century the street was variously referred to as "Clara Stræde" (Clara's Alley) and "Clara boder". The  monastery closed after the Reformations and its buildings were used for a time for other purposes before its site was builtover between 1631 and 1650.

Notable buildings and residents
 
No. 1 is the former Messen department store which fronts Købmagergade. The building was designed by Emil Blichfeldt and completed in 1895.

Gyldendal, Denmark's largest publishing house, is based at No. 3. The building dates from the 1730s and housed Borgerdydskolen ("The School of Civic Virtue") before it was acquired by Søren Gyldendal in 1783.

No 8, 10, 14 and 16 which also date from the 1730, and No. 18  from 1780 are also listed.

Cultural references
It is in Bo-bi Bar that Alex (Nikolaj Lie Kaas) and Aimee -(Maria Bonnevie) meet each other for the first time in Christoffer Boe's 2003 film Reconstruction.

See also
 Gammel Mønt
 Sværtegade

References

External links

 Klareboderne on indenforvoldene.dk
 Gyldendal

Streets in Copenhagen